Matching may refer to:

 Matching, Essex, England
 Matching Green
 Matching Tye
 Matching (graph theory), in graph theory, a set of edges without common vertices
 Graph matching, detection of similarity between graphs
 Matching (statistics), a technique for reducing bias when analyzing data from observational studies
 Matching funds, funds set to be paid in equal amount to funds available from other sources
 Matching principle, an accounting method
 Matching theory (economics), the assigning of job candidates to vacancies
 Matching law, in behaviorism and learning, the matching law suggests that an animal's response rate to a scenario will be proportionate to the amount/duration of reinforcement delivered
 National Resident Matching Program, the process of allocating medical graduates to internship programs
 Matchmaking, the process of introducing people for the purpose of marriage
 Impedance matching, in electronics, attempting to make the output impedance of a source equal to the input impedance of the load to which it is ultimately connected
 Pattern matching, in computer science, a way to recognize patterns in strings or more general sequences of tokens
 String matching algorithm, in computer science, another simpler way to recognize patterns in strings
 Stable matching theory, the study of matching markets
 Matching corresponding trades, the basic operation for clearing (finance)
Employer matching program in the United States

See also
 Match (disambiguation)